Don Enrique Pérez de Guzmán y Fonseca, 2nd Duke of Medina Sidonia (died 1492), became the second Duke in 1468. Born out of wedlock, his birth was later legitimised by the "Reyes Católicos" Ferdinand and Isabella, and consequently he obtained the right to inherit the title from his father, Juan Alonso de Guzmán. He participated in the Conquest of the Emirate of Granada, and was granted in 1478 the title of Marquis of Gibraltar.

In those days, according to historian Salvador de Madariaga, he was considered the wealthiest man in Spain.

References

1492 deaths
Dukes of Medina Sidonia
Year of birth unknown